Rust is a municipality in the district of Ortenau in Baden-Württemberg in Germany.
It is also the home of the famous theme park Europa-Park. The Renaissance era Balthasar Castle is now part of the theme park. The protected floodplain forest Taubergießen is adjacent to Rust.

Geography
Rust is located between the Black Forest and the Vosges where the Elz River merges with the Upper Rhine River Plains from the southeast. The Elz enters the city from the south and runs in a northwesterly direction first through the village and borders the Europa-Park, Germany's largest amusement park.

Neighbouring communities
The following villages are sharing border with Rust. They are listed clockwise starting from the north: Kappel-Grafenhausen, Ringsheim, Rheinhausen. In the east the border is the river Rhine and the village of Rhinau (France).
The next town is Lahr (17 km northwest).

Climate
The Climate in this area has mild differences between highs and lows, and there is adequate rainfall year-round.  The Köppen Climate Classification subtype for this climate is "Cfb" (Marine West Coast Climate/Oceanic climate). However, it is close to being "humid subtropical climate" due to the mean temperatures in July and August just under 22 °C.

References

External links

Ortenaukreis